Škocjan Caves is a cave system in Slovenia. Due to its exceptional significance, Škocjan Caves was entered on UNESCO’s list of natural and cultural World Heritage Sites in 1986. International scientific circles have thus acknowledged the importance of the caves as one of the natural treasures of planet Earth. Ranking among the most important caves in the world, Škocjan Caves represents the most significant underground phenomena both on the Karst Plateau and in Slovenia. Following independence from Yugoslavia in 1991, Slovenia committed itself to actively protecting the Škocjan Caves area and established Škocjan Caves Regional Park and its managing authority, the Škocjan Caves Park Public Service Agency.

Škocjan Caves – World Heritage – UNESCO
 One of the largest known underground canyons in the world
 Examples of natural beauty with great aesthetic value
 Due to particular microclimatic conditions, a special ecosystem has developed
 The area has great cultural and historical significance as it has been inhabited since the prehistoric times
 A typical example of contact karst

Description 

Škocjan Caves represents the most significant underground phenomena in both the Karst region and Slovenia. Škocjan Caves was also entered on the List of Ramsar wetlands of international importance on 18 May 1999. Together with the underground stream of the Reka River, they represent one of the longest karst underground wetlands in Europe.

The Reka River disappears underground at Big Collapse Doline into Škocjan Caves and then flows underground for  surfacing near Monfalcone where it contributes approximately one third of the flow of the Timavo River, which flows  from the Timavo Springs to the Adriatic Sea.

The exceptional volume of the underground canyon is what distinguishes Škocjan Caves from other caves and places it among the most famous underground features in the world. The river flowing through the underground canyon turns northwest before the Cerkvenik Bridge and continues its course along Hanke's Channel. At some points, it expands into huge underground chambers.

History of exploration 

The first written sources on Škocjan Caves originate in the era of Antiquity (2nd century B.C.) by Posidonius of Apamea and they are marked on the oldest published maps of this part of the world; for example the Lazius-Ortelius map from 1561 and Mercator's Novus Atlas from 1637. The fact that the French painter Louis-François Cassas (1782) was commissioned to paint some landscape pieces also proves that in the 18th century the caves were considered one of the most important natural features in the Trieste hinterland. His paintings testify that at that time people visited the bottom of Big Collapse Doline. The Carniolan scholar Johann Weikhard von Valvasor described the sink of the Reka River and its underground flow in 1689.

In order to supply Trieste with drinking water, an attempt was made to follow the underground course of the Reka River. The deep shafts in the Karst were explored as well as Škocjan Caves. The systematic exploration of Škocjan Caves began with a speleology expedition in 1884. Explorers reached the banks of Mrtvo jezero (Dead Lake) in 1890. The last major achievement was the discovery of Silent Cave in 1904, when some local men climbed the  wall of Müller Hall. The next important event took place in 1990, nearly 100 years after the discovery of Dead Lake.

Archaeology 

From time immemorial, people have been attracted to the gorge where the Reka River disappears underground as well as the cave entrances. The Reka River sinks under a rocky wall; on the top of it lies the village of Škocjan, after which the caves are named. Škocjan Caves Regional Park is archaeologically extremely rich; it was inhabited beginning more than ten thousand years ago. A valuable archaeological find in Fly Cave indicates the influence of Greek civilization, where a cave temple was located after the end of the Bronze Age and in the Iron Age. This region was certainly one of the most significant pilgrimage sites in Europe, three thousand years ago, especially in the Mediterranean, where it was of important cult significance in connection with the afterlife and communication with ancestral spirits.

Tourism 

It is difficult to establish when tourism in Škocjan Caves truly commenced. According to some sources, in 1819, the county councilor Matej Tominc (Tominc Cave is named after him) ordered that steps be built to the bottom of Big Collapse Doline. According to other sources, the steps were only renovated. A visitors' book was introduced 1 January 1819. This date is considered the beginning of modern tourism in Škocjan Caves.

In recent years, Škocjan Caves has had around 100,000 visitors per year. The first part of the Caves—Marinič Cave and Mahorčič Cave with Little Collapse Doline—was opened to tourists by 1933. It was severely damaged in a flood in 1963. In 2011, it was renovated and a new steel bridge was added. Visitors can also view the part of the underground canyon with Big Collapse Doline. Tours of the cave are conducted in Slovenian, English, Italian and German.

References

External links

Park Škocjanske jame official website
Škocjan Caves - UNESCO World Heritage Centre listing
Photos of Škocjan Caves
Škocjan Caves at Slovenia Landmarks

World Heritage Sites in Slovenia
Limestone caves
Show caves in Slovenia
Caves of the Slovene Littoral
Wetlands in the Slovene Littoral
Municipality of Divača
Ramsar sites in Slovenia
First 100 IUGS Geological Heritage Sites